Ahmetpaşa is a town (belde) and municipality in the Sinanpaşa District, Afyonkarahisar Province, Turkey. Its population is 2,653 (2021).

References

Populated places in Sinanpaşa District
Towns in Turkey